Piperylone is a pyrazolone with analgesic, anti-inflammatory, and antipyretic properties.

References

Pyrazolones
Analgesics
Antipyretics
Nonsteroidal anti-inflammatory drugs